Nsoko Airfield  is an airstrip serving Nsoko, an agricultural village in the Lubombo Region of Eswatini.

See also
Transport in Eswatini
List of airports in Eswatini

References

External links
 OpenStreetMap - Nsoko Airfield
 OurAirports - Nsoko
 FallingRain - Nsoko Airport
 
 Google Earth

Airports in Eswatini